Maria Goretti Warsi  is an Indian MTV VJ. She has hosted several TV shows including Do It Sweet on the NDTV Good Times channel and I Love Cooking on Living Foodz.

Career 
Goretti was a popular MTV VJ and hosted the TV show Do It Sweet on the NDTV Good Times channel. Goretti made a special appearance in the movie Salaam Namaste along with her son Zeke Warsi. 
She did a small role in the movie Raghu Romeo directed by Rajat kapoor and a sci-fi movie Jaane Hoga Kya. She performed the famous song of Harbhajan Mann in album Oye-Hoye "Kudi Kad Ke Kalja Leigi, Gallan Goriyan Harbhajan Mann".

Personal life 

Goretti married Hindi Film actor Arshad Warsi on 14 February 1999, whom she met in 1991, when he was invited to judge a dance competition in college, in which she was participating. She completed the Mumbai Marathon in 2016.

References

External links

Living people
Indian film actresses
Actresses from Mumbai
Indian women television presenters
Indian television presenters
Indian VJs (media personalities)
Actresses from Goa
Alumni of Le Cordon Bleu
1972 births